In Search of Steve Ditko is a BBC Four documentary. It was first shown on Sunday 16 September 2007.

The documentary is part of the Comics Britannia season and follows Jonathan Ross' attempts to track down comics artist Steve Ditko (known for Spider-Man, Doctor Strange, Mr. A etc.).

Overview
The programme featured interviews with comics creators, editors and others including Jerry Robinson, John Romita Sr., Neil Gaiman, Joe Quesada, Ralph Macchio (comics), Flo Steinberg, Alan Moore, Mark Millar, Stan Lee, and Cat Yronwode.

Ross, accompanied by Gaiman, met Steve Ditko at his New York City office but he declined to be photographed or interviewed for the show.  He did however give the two a selection of some of his old comic books.  At the end of the show Ross said he had since spoken to Ditko on the telephone and was now on first name terms with him.

Reception
Comics historian Peter Sanderson said of the documentary:

References

External links
 

 The unsung hero behind Spider-Man, by Jonathan Ross, The Guardian, 14 September 2007
BBC to screen history of comics, The Guardian, 10 August 2007

2007 in British television
BBC television documentaries
Documentary films about comics